The Finlandia Trophy is an annual senior-level international figure skating competition held in Finland. It was held in Helsinki on October 6–7, 2001. Skaters competed in the disciplines of men's singles, ladies' singles, and ice dancing.

Results

Men

Ladies

Ice dancing

External links
 2001 Finlandia Trophy results 

Finlandia Trophy
Finlandia Trophy, 2001
Finlandia Trophy, 2001